A - B - C - D - E - F - G - H - I - J - K - L - M - N - O - P - Q - R - S - T - U - V - W - XYZ

This is a list of rivers in the United States that have names starting with the letter K.  For the main page, which includes links to listings by state, see List of rivers in the United States.

Ka 
Kachess River - Washington
Kakagon River - Wisconsin
Kakhonak River - Alaska
Kalama River - Washington
Kalamazoo River - Michigan
Kanab Creek - Arizona
Kanawha River - West Virginia
Kanektok River - Alaska
Kankakee River - Indiana, Illinois
Kansas River - Kansas
Kantishna River - Alaska
Karluk River - Alaska
Kasilof River - Alaska
Kaskaskia River - Illinois
Kaukonahua River - Hawaii
Kaweah River - California
Kayaderosseras Creek - New York

Ke 
Kellys Creek - West Virginia
Kenai River - Alaska
Kenduskeag Stream - Maine
Kennebec River - Maine
Kennebunk River - Maine
Kentucky River - Kentucky
Keowee River - South Carolina
Kern River - California
Kettle River - Minnesota, tributary of St. Croix River
Kettle River - Minnesota, tributary of Blueberry River
Kettle River - Washington
Kewaunee River - Wisconsin
Keya Paha River - South Dakota, Nebraska

Ki 
Kiamichi River - Oklahoma
Kickamuit River - Massachusetts, Rhode Island
Kickapoo River - Wisconsin
Kilchis River - Oregon
Killbuck Creek - Ohio
Killik River - Alaska
Killsnake River - Wisconsin
Kinchafoonee Creek - Georgia
King Salmon River (Admiralty Island) - Alaska
King Salmon River (Egegik River) - Alaska
King Salmon River (Nushagak River) - Alaska
King Salmon River (Ugashik River) - Alaska
Kings River - California
Kings River - Nevada
Kinnickinnic River - Wisconsin (Lake Michigan tributary)
Kinnickinnic River - Wisconsin (St. Croix River tributary)
Kinzua Creek - Pennsylvania
Kishwaukee River - Illinois
Kiskiminetas River - Pennsylvania
Kissimmee River - Florida
Kivalina River - Alaska
Kiwalik River - Alaska

Kl - Kn 
Klamath River - Oregon, California
Klaskanine River - Oregon
Klehini River - Alaska
Klickitat River - Washington
Klutina River - Alaska
Knife River - Minnesota
Knife River - North Dakota
Knik River - Alaska
Knox River - New Hampshire

Ko 
Kobuk River - Alaska
Kohlsville River - Wisconsin
Kokolik River - Alaska
Kokosing River - Ohio
Kongakut River - Alaska
Konkapot River - Massachusetts, Connecticut
Kootenai River - Montana
Koyuk River - Alaska
Koyukuk River - Alaska

Ku - Ky 
Kugruk River - Alaska
Kuk River - Alaska
Kukpowruk River - Alaska
Kukpuk River - Alaska
Kuparuk River - Alaska
Kuskokwim River - Alaska
Kuzitrin River - Alaska
Kvichak River - Alaska
Kyte River - Illinois

K